The 2002 South Carolina Gamecocks football team represented the University of South Carolina in the Southeastern Conference (SEC) during the 2002 NCAA Division I-A football season.  The Gamecocks were led by Lou Holtz in his fourth season as head coach and played their home games in Williams-Brice Stadium in Columbia, South Carolina.  The Gamecocks did not finish the season bowl-eligible.

Schedule

Roster

Team players in the NFL

References

South Carolina
South Carolina Gamecocks football seasons
South Carolina Gamecocks football